The Holden EH is an automobile produced by General Motors-Holden in Australia from 1963 to 1965. The EH was released in August 1963 replacing the Holden EJ series, and was the first Holden to incorporate the new "Red" engine, with a seven main bearing crankshaft instead of the four main bearing crankshaft used in the "Grey" engine. At first, a larger capacity  engine was only sold attached to a three-speed manual gearbox or the "Hydramatic" four-stage automatic transmission with a column shift. The Controlled Coupling Hydramatic used in the EH was actually a four-stage, although it effectively worked as a three-speed unit, except at full throttle.EH Holden Owners Manual, General Motors - Holden, 1964 (Provided with car at purchase) The  engine was initially sold only with the "Hydramatic" transmission. The first EH with a 179-cubic-inch engine and a manual gear box was called the "EH-S4", and was fitted with an upgraded manual gearbox, having stronger gears than in the 149 gear box, and an upgraded clutch. The three-speed manual column shift gearboxes had no synchromesh on first gear, only on the second and third (top) gear.

A total of 256,959 EH Holdens were produced and sold from 1963 to 1965, when the EH was replaced by the Holden HD series.

Range 
The Holden EH range was offered in the following models:

 Standard Sedan 
 Standard Station Sedan 
 Special Sedan 
 Special Station Sedan 
 S4 Special Sedan 
 Premier Sedan 
 Premier Station Sedan 
 Utility 
 Panel van 

The Station Sedan name was used on all station wagon models.

"Standard" models were basic, with no side badging, and were mostly fitted with 149-cubic-inch engines, rubber floor mats and single-tone acrylic paint finish. "Special" models came equipped with stainless moulding strips all round, special badges and optional two-tone paint jobs, still in acrylic paint. The "Premier" was the top of the range model, with a 179-cubic-inch engine and Hydramatic transmission, leather interior, bucket seats, fold-down centre armrest in the back seat, carpets, metallic paint, a centre console incorporating a heater/demister, a diamond dot radio, a handbrake warning light and chrome-plated wheel trims. The Standard EH was the same price as its predecessor (EJ) at £1051.

The "S4 Special" was introduced in September 1963 for racing homologation purposes - a minimum of 100 were required to be built & sold. These featured a 179 engine, manual transmission with hardened gears, a  fuel tank ( was standard), a more comprehensive tool kit, metal lined brake shoes and a larger tailshaft. Six were produced at Holden's Melbourne's (Dandenong) plant and 120 in Sydney's (Pagewood) plant.

References 

The Song "EH Leatherette", was recorded by The Detonators, am Australian Rockabilly band, in 2007.

External links 
 A Brief History of the EH Holden Retrieved from The Sixties Holden Archives on 1 March 2009
 EH Holden - Ranleys

Cars introduced in 1963
Cars of Australia
EH
Cars discontinued in 1965